Františkovy Lázně is a spa town in Cheb District in the Karlovy Vary Region of the Czech Republic. It has about 5,200 inhabitants. Together with neighbouring Karlovy Vary and Mariánské Lázně, it is part of the West Bohemian Spa Triangle. The town centre is well preserved and since 1992 has been protected as an urban monument reservation. In 2021, the town became part of the transnational UNESCO World Heritage Site under the name "Great Spa Towns of Europe" because of its natural springs and its architectural testimony to the popularity of spa towns across Europe in the 18th through 20th centuries.

Administrative parts
Villages of Aleje-Zátiší, Dlouhé Mosty, Dolní Lomany, Horní Lomany, Krapice, Slatina and Žírovice are administrative parts of Františkovy Lázně.

Geography
It is situated in the westernmost part of the Cheb Basin.

The Slatinný Stream, a tributary of the Ohře, flows through the municipal territory. The area is rich on fish ponds. The largest of them is Amerika. Its western part with an island is protected as a nature reserve and is an important nesting place and migration stop of water birds. The eastern part of the pond is used for recreation.

History

The salutary effects of the surrounding springs were known from the late 14th century on. The physician Georgius Agricola (1494–1555) mentioned the mineral water available to Cheb citizens. The sources from which, according to ancient law, water was drafted and brought to the city, were first used locally for salutary purposes. Later, the water was also shipped in earthenware bottles and in 1700, it reportedly sold more water than all other spas in the Empire combined. About 1705, an inn was erected at the site of a mineral spring later known as Franzensquelle.

On 27 April 1793, the town was officially founded under the name Kaiser Franzensdorf, after Emperor Francis II, and later renamed Franzensbad. The spa was founded by Eger-based doctor Bernhard Adler (1753–1810). He promoted the expansion of spa facilities and the accommodation for those seeking healing and promoted the transformation of the swampy moorland with paths and footbridges to well-known sources. The town was laid out around 24 springs in an orthogonal plan.

When in 1791 Adler had a pavilion and a water basin erected at the Franzensquelle, he sparked the Egerer Weibersturm ("Women's storm of Eger") by numerous women who earned their livelihood in the scooping, transport and sale of the water in Eger. Feeling their water-bearing rights threatened, they demolished his premises. The town council of Cheb intervened and made the extension of Franzensbad as a health resort possible. The result was an extensive recreation area, with easy access from the town of Cheb. In 1852, the spa became an independent municipality.

Johann Wolfgang von Goethe was one of the most famous guests in the early days; his visits of Franzensbad were extensively reported in the book written by Johannes Urzidil Goethe in Böhmen (1932). Another notable visitors were Ludwig van Beethoven, Johann Strauss Jr., Božena Němcová, Archduke Charles I of Austria, and Emperor Francis Joseph I of Austria, who promoted Františkovy Lázně to a town in 1865.

During the 19th century, patients included numerous aristocrats, especially Russian nobles, and at the same time widely known doctors bolstered the reputation of Franzensbad as a therapeutic resort. Franzensbad offered one of the first peat pulp baths in Europe, popular especially with female guests. A public spa house was built in 1827. The writer Marie von Ebner-Eschenbach portrayed her stay in her early work Aus Franzensbad in 1858.

At the turn of the 19th and 20th centuries, the spa was visited by up to 20,000 patients and almost 80,000 spa tourists.

Until 1918, the town was part of the Bohemian crown land of the Austria-Hungary. After World War I, the town's reputation began to fade. Then part of the new state of Czechoslovakia, the spa lost much of its patronage and was hit hard by the Great Depression of 1929. After World War II, the German-speaking population was expelled under the Beneš decrees. The spa, officially renamed Františkovy Lázně in Czech, was nationalized under the rule of the Communist Party. After the Velvet Revolution of 1989, a stock company was established to revive the status of Františkovy Lázně as a venue for international guests.

Demographics

Spa

Twenty-three out of the 24 springs in the town are actively used, and local natural mineral water has a relatively high content of dissolved carbon dioxide, although the ratios of the chemical components vary across all of the springs. The mineral-rich springs are formed from infiltration of precipitation into the sedimentary Cheb Basin. The effects of the carbonic baths are shown in the better performance of the cardiovascular system, in the mild decrease of blood pressure in the pulse, in the lower occurrence of chronic inflammatory processes in the body, and also in terms of rheumatics, and in the improved blood circulation in tissues and the vegetative stabilisation.

The local mud treatments represent a traditional curative method which has thermal, chemical and mechanical effects. The mud treatment consists of a thick mushy combination of mud and mineral water which is heated up to a temperature which is significantly higher than body temperature. The treatment has a positive effect on mobility of muscles and the pain in treated tissues.

The local spa corporation is the biggest spa corporation in the Czech Republic. It unites eight spa houses and hotels with a capacity of about 1,500 beds. It operated 24 mineral springs, 12 of which are still in operation.

Culture
The townscape of Františkovy Lázně is largely shaped by neoclassical and Belle Époque buildings of the Habsburg era, as well as by extended parks and gardens with numerous springs and bathhouses.

The Social House is the dominant feature of the spa centre. It was built in 1877 in neo-renaissance style. It is the venue of congresses, balls and other social events and the building also houses a casino.

Theatre of Božena Němcová was built in the current area in 1868. New theatre building was built in neoclassical style in 1927–1928 and interiors were decorated in Art Deco style.

The town has two museums: the Town Museum and small Museum of Motorcycles and Cars.

Notable people
August Brömse (1873–1925), Bohemian-German painter
Friedrich Stelzner (1921–2020), German academic surgeon
Miroslav Kostelka (born 1951), diplomat and politician
Ladislav Takács (born 1996), footballer

Twin towns – sister cities

Františkovy Lázně is twinned with:
 Bad Soden, Germany

References

External links

Official website of the Spa corporation

Spa towns in the Czech Republic
Cities and towns in the Czech Republic
Populated places in Cheb District